Jonas Yom-Tob Spitz (1797–1874) was a teacher of Hebrew and German in the Jewish school of Prague during the first half of the nineteenth century. He was the author of Alon bakut (Prague, 1826), on the death of his grandfather Rabbi Eleazar Fleckeles of Prague; Zikhron Eliezer (Prague, 1827), a biography of Fleckeles; and Toledot Yitzḥak, a biography of his father, Isaac Spitz. Spitz was a collaborator on the Bikkure ha-Ittim, to volumes VI and VII of which he contributed sixteen scientific essays.

References
 

1797 births
1874 deaths
19th-century essayists
19th-century Jews
Bohemian Jews
Hebrew-language writers
Male essayists
Writers from Prague